Li Qiming (September 1915 – December 19, 2007) was a People's Republic of China politician. He was born in Shenchi County, Shanxi Province. He was governor of Shaanxi Province.

References 

1915 births
2007 deaths
People's Republic of China politicians from Shanxi
Chinese Communist Party politicians from Shanxi
Governors of Shaanxi
Political office-holders in Yunnan
Chinese police officers
Politicians from Xinzhou